Neil Risch is an American human geneticist and professor at the University of California, San Francisco (UCSF).  Risch is the Lamond Family Foundation Distinguished Professor in Human Genetics and Director of the Institute for Human Genetics and Professor of Epidemiology and Biostatistics at UCSF.

Known for his work on numerous genetic diseases including torsion dystonia, Risch emphasizes the links between population genetics and clinical application, believing that understanding human population history and disease susceptibility go hand in hand.

Population genetics 

Risch has conducted significant work on the nature of human differences on a geographical scale. For instance, he used social and genetic data to analyse genetic admixture from White, African, and Native American ancestry in Puerto Rico, as well as relating this to geographical variation in social status.

Risch considers that genetic drift is a more compelling explanation for the carrier frequency of lysosomal storage diseases in Ashkenazi Jews than heterozygote advantage, in light of analysis of the results of recent genetic testing by his collaborators and himself.

After mapping torsion dystonia by linkage disequilibrium (LD) analysis he found it was genetically dominant and was a founder mutation. Other work has focused on the genetic basis of Parkinson's disease, hemochromatosis, multiple sclerosis, diabetes, autism, epilepsy and hypertension.

Group structure 

Risch has worked on the genetic structure of human groups, for instance multiple levels of structure above the level of the individual increasing in scale up to the level of race. He has translated these results into theoretical impacts on, for instance, rate of decay of linkage disequilibrium, and practical application in personalised medicine. For instance, using the Framingham data, he showed that  population stratification leads not only to a fewer heterozygotes than predicted from Hardy–Weinberg equilibrium but also to spouses sharing identical genotypes at all ancestrally informative markers, accounted for by ancestry-related assortative mating in the previous generation.

Psychiatric disease 

In a small twin study on Autism (around 50 twin pairs for each disease and zygosity), he argued these disorders may be less heritable than previously considered, implicating a significant family-level environment effect.

Homosexuality 
Risch has been a prominent critic of studies on the role of genetics in sexual orientation.  In 1999, he published a small sib-pair study that failed to replicate a previously observed linkage  between male sexual orientation and Xq28 DNA markers. However, an independent study of a larger, carefully selected sample later verified the Xq28 link, which mapped to the same location found in the original study.   The reason that Risch's study failed to find linkage is unknown, but he continued to criticize this area of research in his 2015 ASHG Presidential Address   which some scientists found offensive.

Awards
Risch is the 2004 recipient of the Curt Stern Award from the American Society of Human Genetics. He has held faculty appointments at Columbia, Yale, and Stanford Universities, and is a graduate of the biomathematics program at the University of California at Los Angeles.

References

External links
UCSF website homepage
 Human Genetics Home page

Living people
Population geneticists
Statistical geneticists
American geneticists
Genetic epidemiologists
University of California, Los Angeles alumni
Columbia University faculty
Yale University faculty
Stanford University School of Medicine faculty
University of California, San Francisco faculty
Year of birth missing (living people)